The 1976 Horsham District Council election took place on 6 May 1976 to elect members of Horsham District Council in England. It was held on the same day as other local elections. The Conservatives won a majority of 9 on the council, gaining from Independent. In a number of seats, candidates who stood as an Independent in 1973, when these seats were last contested, stood again as a Conservative Party candidate. Residents' association won their first seat to the council, winning a seat in Henfield. The Liberal Party lost both of their seats from the previous election three years ago.

Council Composition 

Prior to the election, the composition of the council was:

After the election, the composition of the council was:

Results summary

Ward results

Ashington & Washington

Billingshurst

Griffin C. stood as a Conservative candidate and Longhurst K. stood as an Independent in 1973, when this seat was last contested.

Bramber & Upper Beeding

Broadbridge Heath

Cowfold

Henfield

Horsham South

Horsham West

Horsham North

Nuthurst

Mackenzie J. was elected as an Independent unopposed when this seat was last contested.

Pulborough & Coldwatham

Roffey

Bosanquet D. was elected as an Independent in 1973, when this seat was last contested.

Rudgwick

Rusper

Phelps A. Ms. was elected unopposed as an Independent in 1973, when this seat was last contested.

Shipley

Slinfold

Southwater

Steyning

Storrington

Sullington

Thakeham

Warnham

Hodgson A. was elected unopposed as an Independent in 1973, when this seat was last contested.

West Chiltington

Gardner J. was elected unopposed as an Independent in 1973, when this seat was last contested.

West Grinstead

References

1976 English local elections
May 1976 events in the United Kingdom
1976
1970s in West Sussex